Deen Dayal Antyodaya Yojana or DAY is one of the Government of India scheme for helping the poor by providing skill training. It replaces Aajeevik. The Government of India has provisioned  for the scheme. The objective of the scheme is to train 0.5 million people in urban areas per annum from 2016. In rural areas the objective is to train 1 million people by 2017. Further, in urban areas, services like SHG promotion, training centres, vendors markets, and permanent shelters for homeless. The aim of the scheme is skill development of both rural and urban India as per requisite international standards.

History
The initial scheme Swarnajayanti Gram Swarozgar Yojana (SGSY) was launched in 1999. It was renamed as National Rural Livelihood Mission in 2011. Finally they were merged into DDU-AY.

The SGSY was somewhat intended to provide self-employment to millions of villagers. The programme aims at bringing the assisted poor families above the poverty line by organising them into self-help groups (SHGs) through a mix of bank credit and government subsidy. The main aim of these SHGs was to bring these poor families above the poverty line and concentrate on income generation through combined effort. The Swarna Jayanti Swarozgar Yojna (SGSY) has been renamed as National Rural Livelihood Mission (NRLM). With this the scheme will be made universal, more focussed and time bound for poverty alleviation by 2014.

Purpose
"Extended to all the 4,041 statutory cities and towns of the country, DAY-NULM aims at reducing urban poverty by improving livelihood opportunities through skill training and skill upgradation for self-employment, subsidised bank loans for setting up micro-enterprises, organising urban poor into self-help groups, among others."

Provisions

The programme aims at bringing the assisted poor families above the poverty line by organising them into self help groups through a mix of bank credit and government subsidy.

Progress
From 2014 to 2016, skills have been imparted to 4.54 lakh urban poor, giving employment to one lakh (22%) such people. Further  was disbursed for setting up 2,527 group enterprises. According to the press release by the government, Tamil Nadu, Madhya Pradesh, Uttar Pradesh, Andhra Pradesh and Telangana aced the implementation of DAY-NULM for the period from 2014 to 2016.

Start-up village entrepreneurship programme 
The SVEP is implemented by Deendayal Antyodaya Yojana –National Rural Livelihoods Mission (DAY-NRLM), Ministry of Rural Development, as a sub-scheme since 2016.
Its aims are to support the rural poor come out of poverty, supporting them set up enterprises and provide support till the enterprises stabilize.
SVEP focuses on providing self-employment opportunities with financial assistance and training in business management and soft skills while creating local community cadres for promotion of enterprises.
It addresses three major pillars of rural start-ups namely – finances, incubation and skill ecosystems.

References

Citations
Deen Dayal Awas Yojna

Sources
 
 

Government schemes in India
Memorials to Deendayal Upadhyay
Modi administration initiatives
Rural development in India
1999 in India